

D

E

F

G

H